Events in the year 1869 in Argentina.

Incumbents
 President: Domingo Faustino Sarmiento
 Vice President: Adolfo Alsina

Governors
 Buenos Aires Province: Emilio de Castro y Rocha 
 Cordoba: Félix de la Peña
 Mendoza Province: Nicolás Villanueva
 Santa Fe Province: Mariano Cabal

Vice Governors
Buenos Aires Province: vacant

Deaths
 September 6 – Valentín Alsina

 
1860s in Argentina
History of Argentina (1852–1880)
Years of the 19th century in Argentina